Nestor Courakis is Emeritus Professor of Criminology and Penology at the National and Kapodistrian University of Athens, Faculty of Law and a full-time Professor at the University of Nicosia.

Born May 21, 1947 in Athens he attended the Law Faculty, University of Athens (LL.M. 1971), Law Faculty, University of Freiburg/Germany (Ph.D. on Penal Law 1978 with "summa cum laude"), Law Faculty, Panthéon-Assas University ("Diplôme d' Études approfondies" in Criminology, 1977), Paris Institute of Criminology (Diploma 1979); research work at Max-Planck Institute of Foreign and International Criminal Law (Freiburg, Germany) 1978-80.

He has been awarded the "Aghis Tambakopoulos Prize" of the Academy of Athens for his treatise on the Abuse of Rights (1974) and the Prize of Society of Greek Penalists for his scientific work (1985); has been elected and taught as visiting fellow at Brasenose College, Oxford University (1996, 1997). He is also ordinary member of the European Academy of Sciences and Arts (2012).

A Faculty member at University of Athens, Faculty of Law, since 1981, he is actively involved with the teaching of Criminology, Forensics, Penology, Financial Crimes, Gender Criminality and Criminal Policy. In August 2014 he was awarded the title of Emeritus Professor at University of Athens, Faculty of Law, and in September 2014 he became a full-time Professor in the field of Penal Sciences at the University of Nicosia.

He has been the scientific supervisor of research teams on Hooliganism (1986–88), on Juvenile Detainees (1993-94 and Follow-up research 1999-2002), on Female Detainees (1994–96), on Juvenile Gangs in Athens (2002-2004) and on Euthanasia (2005-2007).

He has participated in Committee for the drafting of a new Greek Penitentiary Code and has represented Greece in several criminological meetings at the Council of Europe, the United Nations and the European Union; has also participated in several international conferences and has presented country-reports (e.g. International Congress of Comparative Law, Athens 1994, on Alternative Penal Sanctions in Greece, and at Preparatory Colloquium of AIDP on Organized Crime, Alexandria 1997); scientific counselor on criminological and penological matters at the Ministry of Justice, Athens 1990-93; mem. Bd. Trustees of Hellenic Society of Criminology etc.; has been mem. European Society of Criminology, International Association of Penal Law (AIDP), Société Internationale de Défence Sociale, World Society of Victimology. He has also been the Director of the Centre for Criminal and Penological Research (2001-2015), as well as the President of the Consultative Body against Corruption (2013-2015).

In December 2015 he was awarded an Honorary Volume by his colleagues and students. During the award ceremony, the Rector of the University of Athens, Mr. Thanos Dimopoulos, addressed Nestoras Kourakis as "one of the most renowned members of our university community and a leading Criminologist". Also, in September 2017, he was awarded an Honorary Volume by his colleagues with foreign language contributions in Freiburg, Germany (Max-Planck Institute for Foreigners and International Criminal Law). Both Honorary Volumes are available online free of charge.

Publications include: in Greek: "Economic Crimes" 1982/1998/2007, "Criminological Horizons" 1991/2005, "Penal Repression" 1985/1997/2005/2009, "Juvenile Justice System" 2004, "On the Abuse of Rights" 1978, "On Penalties, according to the Greek Criminal Code" 1993/2008, "Criminal Policy" (ed.), 4 volumes 1994-2003, "Juvenile Delinquents and Society" (in Greek and English) 1999, "On Individual Self-Defense", German Dissertation 1982, more than 170 articles in legal reviews or Congress acts and honorary volumes.

He is married with architect Eurydike Athanasopoulos and has three children.

He speaks English, French, German and Italian.

Main publications in English, German, French and Italian

1.	Introduction à l’étude de la criminalité en col blanc (Revue de Science criminelle, 1974, 765-781).

2.	Réflexions sur la problématique de la criminalité en col blanc (Revue pénitentiaire et de Droit pénal, 1976, 263-278).

3.	Contribution à une analyse pluridisciplinaire de l’infanticide (Revue pénitentiaire et de Droit pénal, 1978, 345-362).

4.	Zur sozialethischen Begründung der Notwehr. Die sozialethischen Schranken des Notwehrrechts nach deutschem und griechischem Strafrecht, Baden - Baden: Nomos Verlagsgesellschaft, 1978 (Rechtsvergleichende Untersuchungen zur gesamten Strafrechtswissenschaft: Folge 3, Band 4), pp. 134.

5.	(Individual) Self-Defence, Contribution to the project of an international Penal Code, ronéo Paris 1977, pp. 12.

6.	Struktur- und Auslegungsaspekte des angelsächsischen Strafrechts, Goltdammer’s Archiv für Strafrecht (GA), 1981, 533- 557.

7.	Die Möglichkeiten einer kriminalpolitischen Anwendung des Umgehungsbegriffes, contribution to the Volume in honour of Professor Alexander Ligeropoulo, Athens (Faculty of Law, University of Athens) 1985, 215-271.

8.	Pour une Ethnopsychologie pénale. Remarques sur les rapports entre l’ Ethnopsychologie et la Sociologie pénale, in: L’Année sociologique 1982, P.U.F. 1983, 391-414.

9.	Conception et principes du Droit pénal économique de la Grèce, Rapport national (adjoint) - Grèce, Revue Internationale de Droit pénal, 54: 1983, 1 & 2, 331-370.

10.	Wirtschaftsdelikte in Griechenland: Erscheinungsformen und Kriminalpolitik, in: Karlhans Liebl (Hrsg.), Internationale Forschungsergebnisse auf dem Gebiet der Wirtschaftskriminalität, Phaffenweiler: Centaurus Verlagsgesellschaft, 1987, 73-86.

11.	Rapport concernant l' évolution récente de la criminalité en Grèce, dans: Volume commémoratif a propos du 20ème anniversaire de la Section Hellénique de la Société Internationale de Défense Sociale, Thessalonique, 1992, pp. 237–244.

12.	Crime in Modern-Day Greece: An Overview (National Report), in review "Chronics" of the Laboratory of Criminology and Forensic Psychiatry at the University of Thrace, No. 8, Dec. 1993, 61-80.

13.	Alternative Penal Sanctions in Greece (National Report), in «Asset Protection and Financial Crime», No 2: 1994, 257-264 = Revue Hellénique de Droit International, 47:1994, 437-444.

14.	Greece: Coping with EU Fraud, in: «Journal of Financial Crime», τ. 4: July 1996, 78-84 (author’s participation to the Greek part of the «Eurofraud» Project, sponsored by the «European Documentation and Research Network on Cross Border Crime», 1995).

15.	Football Violence: Not only a British Problem, paper presented on the occasion of seminars on Crime Policy, organized in Oxford University by Professors Roger Hood (Oxford Univ.) and Nestor Courakis (Athens University) during the period 30.4-1007 - 4.6.1997; published in: The Changing Face of Crime and Criminal Policy in Europe, edited by Roger Hood and Nestor E. Courakis, University of Oxford, 1999, 88-100.

16.	Organized Crime - Country Report for Greece at Preparatory Colloquium of AIDP on Organized Crime, Alexandria 1997, in: Revue internationale de Droit pénal, τ. 69, 1998, 369-388.

17.	A contribution to the Search for Ancient Helike, in: Volume in honour of Professor Ioannis Triandafyllopoulos, Athens, Ant. Sakkoulaw Publ., 2000, 23-38 = Dora Katsonopoulou / Steven Soter / Demetrius Schilardi, Αρχαία Ελίκη και Αιγιαλεία - Ancient Helike and Aigialeia, Proceedings the Second International Conference on Ancient Helike, Aigion, 1-3.12.1995, Athens 1998, 235-250.

18.	Juvenile delinquents and society. A study of the fundamental values, institutions and juvenile delinquency in Greece, Έφηβοι παραβάτες και Κοινωνία. Θεμελιώδεις αξίες, θεσμοί και νεανική παραβατικότητα στην Ελλάδα (a bilingual edition, No 1 of the series: European Studies in Law), Athens, A.N. Sakkoulas Publ.,1999, pp. 183 ff.

19.	Financial Crime in Greece today», contribution to the Volume in honour of Prof. Dionysios Spinellis, Athens, A.N. Sakkoulas Publ. 2001, 269-292 = European Journal on Criminal Policy and Research, 9: 2001, 197 - 219.

20.	A typology of juvenile justice systems in Europe, Contribution to the Volume in honour of Professor Alice Yotopoulos – Marangopoulos, Athens, Nomiki Vivliothiki Publ., 2003, 251-273.

21.	Le prononcé de la peine et les Droits de l' Homme, in: Alice Yotopoulos – Marangopoulos (dir.), Droits de l' Homme et Politique criminelle, Athènes/Komotini/Bruxelles, 2007, 31 - 52.

22.	Strafrecht und Utopie, Contribution to the Volume (Festschrift) in honour of Professor Manfred Seebode, De Gruyter Verlag, 2008, 3 – 13.

23.	Die Rolle des Kriminologen bei der Gestaltung der Kriminalpolitik, Contribution to the Volume (Festschrift) in honour of Professor Klaus Tiedemann, Carl Heymanns Verlag, 2008, 1577 -1581.

24.	 L’ethnopsychologie entre la sociologie pénale et le droit penal, in: Essays in honour of Prof. Aglaia Tsitsoura, Athens/Thessaloniki, Sakkoulas Editions, 2009, 383-452.

25.	Diritto penale e utopia, in: Diritto penale XXI secolo, anno X – 1/2011, 161-171.

26.	The Future of Criminality and the Criminology of the Future, under the Shadow of Globalization, in: Essays in honour of Professor James Farsedakis, Athens: Nomiki Vivliothiki Publ., 2011, 1873-1887.

27.	Confronting Corruption in Greece, in “The Art of Crime”, English internet edition (www.theartofcrime.gr), issue 3, May 2011.

28.     Confronting Corruption in Greece and Italy (in collaboration with Prof. Grazia Mannozzi), in: Professor Dr. Chr. Dedes in memoriam (Gedächtnisschrift), Athen/Komotini: Ant.N. Sakkoulas, 2013, 11-44.

29.     Towards a Greek  immigration policy with humanity and an effective outcome, in:  European  Public  Law  Series,  vol.  CXIII,  Contemporary  Immigration in Greece: A Sourcebook, edited by Th. Fouskas & Vas. Tsevrenis, 2014, pp. 45–49.

30.     Anti-corruption efforts in Greece: Between Law in Books and Law in Action, in: “The Art of Crime”, English internet edition (www.theartofcrime.gr), issue 7, July 2015.

31.     Editorial entitled: “An Introduction to the Special Issue on the Problem of Corruption and on Feasible Ways of Tackling it”, in: “The Art of Crime”, English internet edition (www.theartofcrime.gr), issue 7, July 2015.

32. The Protection of Whistleblowers in Greece following the Introduction of Law-Nr. 4254/2014. Some Critical Remarks. Paper presented in Nicosia, within the frame of a Conference on Whistleblowing (“SpeakUp Conference), which was organized by Transparency International Cyprus on 22.10.2015, EUCPN Newsletter, February 2016.

33. Anti-corruption measures: the panacea of a financial cliff (co-authored with Maria Kapardis), in: Dion, M./ Weisstub, D./ Richet, D.-L., Financial Crimes: Psychological, Technological, and Ethical Issues, Springer International Publishing as No. 68 in its series “International Library of Ethics, Law, and the New Medicine”, 2016, 3-31.

34. Droit pénal et Procédure pénale en Grėce (in collaboration with Ath. Sykiotou), in: S. Vrellis (dir.), Droit de la Grèce, Paris: Association Henri Capitant:/ LGDJ, 2018, 39-46.

35. Social Justice as a new objective of Criminal Policy, beyond Restorative Justice (co-authored with Theo Gavrielides), in: Theo Gavrielides (ed.), Routledge International Handbook of Restorative Justice, London: Routledge, 2019, 43-55.

36. In search for a new Eutopia in Criminal Policy: The Role of Social Justice, in: Ceremonial Presentation of the Festschrift in Honour of Prof. Dr. Nestor Courakis, Keynote Speech, Freiburg/ Br.: Max-Planck Gesellschaft, 2017, 40-57. 

37. Self-defense as a domain of modern paternalism: The need of social solidarity and cohesion, in: Charis Papacharalambous (ed.), Paternalism and Criminal Law Discourse. Modern Problems of an Old Query, Peter Lang, 2018, 135-145.   

38. Constraints on deciding sentence severity by judges in Greece, in: Charis Papacharalambous (ed.), Aims of Punishment, Nomos / Sakkoulas, 2020 (under publication).  

39. The principle of proportionality: Tracing out its historical evolution (co-authored with Dr. Vagia Polyzoidou), in: Emm. Billis/ Nandor Knust/ Jon Petter Rui (eds.), The Principle of Proportionality in Crime Control and Criminal Justice, London: Hart Publishing, 2021 (under publication). 

40. Juvenile Justice in Greece. An Overview following the Legislative Reform of 2019, in: Marc Engelhart/ Hans Kudlich/ Benjamin Vogel (eds.), Festschrift für Ulrich Sieber, Berlin: Duncker & Humblot, 2020 (under publication).

References

Living people
1947 births
Academic staff of the National and Kapodistrian University of Athens
Greek criminologists
University of Freiburg alumni
Paris 2 Panthéon-Assas University alumni
Academic staff of the University of Nicosia
Writers from Athens